William Beaty Boyd (February 2, 1923 – December 16, 2020) was an American academic administrator and professor. Boyd was an alumnus of Presbyterian College (BA 1946), Emory University (MA 1947), and the University of Pennsylvania (Ph.D. 1954). He was a professor of history at Michigan State University and Alma College. He was also Vice Chancellor of Student Affairs at the University of California, Berkeley.

Boyd served as president of Central Michigan University from 1968 to 1975 and the University of Oregon from 1975 to 1980. In the fall of 1977, National Lampoon's Animal House was filmed on the Oregon campus and in greater Eugene. He died at his home in Racine, Wisconsin at the age of 97 on December 16, 2020.

References

1923 births
2020 deaths
Presidents of Central Michigan University
Presidents of the University of Oregon
People from Mount Pleasant, South Carolina
Presbyterian College alumni
Emory University alumni
University of Pennsylvania alumni